Oedemasia leptinoides, the black-blotched schizura or black-blotched prominent, is a species of moth in the family Notodontidae (the prominents). It was first described by Augustus Radcliffe Grote in 1864 and is found in North America.

The MONA or Hodges number for Oedemasia leptinoides is 8011.

This species was formerly a member of the genus Schizura, but was transferred to Oedemasia as a result of research published in 2021.

References

Further reading

External links

 

Notodontidae
Articles created by Qbugbot
Moths described in 1864